A harvest festival is an annual celebration that occurs around the time of the main harvest of a given region. "Harvest festival" or "Harvest Festival" may also refer to:
Harvest Festival (United Kingdom)
Thanksgiving, harvest festival in the United States
Harvest Festival (Taiwan)
Ami’s Harvest Festival, celebrated by Ami ethnic group in Taiwan
Harvest Festival (Parks and Recreation), an episode of Parks and Recreation
Aktion Erntefest ("Operation Harvest Festival"), Nazi murder of 43,000 Jews on 2–3 November 1943